The Masters Water Ski Tournament is an annual invitational water ski competition, taking place each year on Memorial Day weekend at Callaway Gardens, just outside of Pine Mountain, Georgia. The inaugural tournament took place in 1959, with Joe Cash and Nancie Rideout winning the overall event.

Champions

References

Waterski